Vitulus may refer to:

 Vitulus Aureus (the golden calf), a book by Dutch alchemist Johann Friedrich Schweitzer
 Hexanchus vitulus, the bigeyed sixgill shark, a shark species
 a Roman cognomen